The 2008 Guolian Securities Jiangsu Classic was a professional non-ranking snooker tournament that took place between 4 and 8 June 2008 in two cities in the Jiangsu Province, China.

The round-robin stage consisted of two groups of six players, eight top 16 players and four Chinese wild cards. The final was staged at the Wuxi Sports Center in Wuxi, while the rest of the tournament had been held at the Nanjing Olympic Sports Center Gymnasium in Nanjing.

Ding Junhui, the only player to have won all his matches, delighted his home crowd by taking the title with a tense final frame decider defeat of Mark Selby.


Prize fund
The breakdown of prize money for this year is shown below: 
Winner: £20,000
Runner-Up: £9,000
Semi-final: £4,000
3rd place in group: £2,000
4th place in group: £1,000
Appearance Fees for 8 professionals: £2,500
Highest break: £1,000
Total: £64,000

Round-robin stage

Group A

(breaks above 50 shown between brackets), breaks 100 and above will be indicated bold.

 Shaun Murphy 2–0 Jin Long → (80) 137–0, (65) 107–0
 Neil Robertson 0–2 Liang Wenbo → 54–59, 3–115 (89)
 Ryan Day 0–2 Joe Perry → 43–65, 9–63 (62)
 Shaun Murphy 2–1 Liang Wenbo → 72–52, 1–85 (76), 69–18
 Ryan Day 2–1 Neil Robertson → 73–50, 30–68 (64), (59) 68–23
 Shaun Murphy 1–2 Neil Robertson → 7–81, 72-(52), 37–71
 Joe Perry 2–1 Jin Long → 72–23, 40–72, 77–40
 Ryan Day 2–1 Jin Long → 0-(86), (100)-0, (73) 77–0
 Joe Perry 2–1 Liang Wenbo → 40–76, 61–44, (77) 83–1
 Ryan Day 2–0 Liang Wenbo → (91) 92–28, (89)-20
 Shaun Murphy 0–2 Joe Perry → 44–64, ?-?
 Neil Robertson 0–2 Jin Long → 26–59 (59), 8–92
 Liang Wenbo 0–2 Jin Long → 40–80, 0–91 (62)
 Neil Robertson 0–2 Joe Perry → 6–94, 43–92 (81)
 Shaun Murphy 0–2 Ryan Day → 7–98 (62), 58–70

Group B

(breaks above 50 shown between brackets), breaks 100 and above will be indicated bold.

 Mark Selby 2–1 → Li Hang 57–7, 2–66 (64), (100) 119–4
 Peter Ebdon 1–2 Liu Chuang → (66) 79–25, (53)-55, 35–59
 Ali Carter 0–2  Ding Junhui → 15–109 (108), 2–64
 Mark Selby 2–0 Liu Chuang → (102) 111–0, (86)-33
 Ali Carter 2–1 Peter Ebdon → (68) 69–0, 0–102 (93), 68–35
 Ding Junhui 2–1 Li Hang → (72)-0, 31–70 (54), 85–44
 Mark Selby 1–2 Peter Ebdon → 71–43, 16-(100), 20–82 (68)
 Ali Carter 0–2 Li Hang → 0–79 (75), 4–50
 Ding Junhui 2–0 Liu Chuang → (77) 78–11, 61–54
 Ali Carter 2–1 Liu Chuang → 68–52, 23–72, 62–55
 Mark Selby 0–2 Ding Junhui → 10-(110), 30–69
 Peter Ebdon 2–1 Li Hang → (60) 84–8, 35–73, 66–17
 Liu Chuang 2–0 Li Hang → 68–8, 65–18
 Peter Ebdon 1–2 Ding Junhui → 2–76, (59) 77–0, 66–68
Mark Selby 2–1 Ali Carter → (62) 67–24, 0–124 (52,72), (72)-1

Knock-out stages

* 32–71, (51) 75–43, 1–75 (52), 1–81 (74), 22–97 (81)
** (52) 75–21, (81) 85–0, (75) 120–1, (108) 120–0

Final

Century breaks

 110, 108, 108  Ding Junhui
 102, 100  Mark Selby
 100  Ryan Day
 100  Peter Ebdon

References

Wuxi Classic
Jiangsu Classic
Jiangsu Classic